Charbonneau may refer to:

People
 Charbonneau (surname)

Places 
Charbonneau, North Dakota
Charbonneau, Oregon

Wine grapes
Charbonneau (grape), another name for the French wine grape Douce noir
Dolcetto, Italian wine grape that is also known as Charbonneau

Other uses
Centre Pierre Charbonneau, a sports arena in Montreal
Charbonneau Commission, a commission of inquiry in Quebec, Canada into potential corruption in the management of public construction contracts
Hotel Charbonneau, Priest River, Idaho
Olivier-Charbonneau Bridge, on the Rivière des Prairies, between Laval and Montreal

See also 
Carbonneau (disambiguation)